House Work is a novel by the American writer Kristina McGrath set in 1950s Pittsburgh, Pennsylvania.

It tells the story of a working-class family of five through shifting points of view. The novel's focus is on a mother's heroism in raising her three children alone after the disintegration of her marriage. Defying the advice of her parish priest, Anna Hallissey leaves her alcoholic husband and re-establishes a home for her children by cleaning other people's houses.

The novel was chosen by The New York Times Book Review as a notable book of the year in 1994.

References

1994 American novels
Novels set in Pittsburgh
Fiction set in the 1950s